Cliza can refer to: 
Cliza Municipality
Cliza (town)